Biljana Relić (born 21 March 1998) is a Serbian sprint canoer.

Her last victories are the women's k-2 500m with Marija Dostanić and the women's k-1 200m kayak single in the European Sprint Championships U-23 2019.

She finished 13th in the K-1 200 metres event at the 2018 Canoe Sprint World Championships.

References

1998 births
Living people
Sportspeople from Novi Sad
Serbian female canoeists